Dyseuaresta trinotata is a species of tephritid or fruit flies in the genus Dyseuaresta of the family Tephritidae.

Distribution
Puerto Rico, Virgin Island.

References

Tephritinae
Insects described in 1934
Diptera of North America